Phil Mellor (Phil 'Mez' Mellor, died 7 June 1989) was a Yorkshire-based English motorcycle racer. His career included racing on both road and race circuits. Mellor, from Shelley, near Huddersfield, West Yorkshire, died after an accident at Doran's Bend during the 1989 TT races on the  Isle of Man.

His race results included the 1984 TT Formula 2 Championship aboard a Yamaha 350, 125cc Gold Star 1981 Championship aboard a Honda, 1300cc Production 1986 British championship on a Suzuki, back to back 750cc Production championships in 1986 and 1987 for Suzuki, 1979 British 250cc Championship, Avon Roadrunner Production 500cc championship on a Yamaha 350 and back to back Honda 125cc championship victories in 1980 and 1981.

Road race results included three wins, seven podiums and a total of 34 appearances at the Isle of Man TT. He also competed at the NW200, Ulster GP, won the 1978 Newcomers Lightweight Manx Grand Prix and scored a fifth place at Macau.

The popular Yorkshireman has a Trophy named in his honour at the Gold Cup races held at Oliver's Mount, a road-based circuit through parkland, in the North Yorkshire east coast holiday resort of Scarborough.

References

1954 births
1989 deaths
English motorcycle racers
Motorcycle racers who died while racing
Sport deaths in the Isle of Man
People from Shelley, West Yorkshire